Michael Schäffer (11 November 1937 – 7 September 1978) was a German lutenist.

He was a pioneer in the rediscovery of French Baroque lute works and concertized widely as soloist and with chamber ensembles.

Schäffer was born in Cologne. He received a musical education, as a violinist and violist, with his father Kurt Schäffer at the Robert Schumann Hochschule. His work as a guitarist generated an interest in the lute. His formal education took place at Staatliche Musikhochschule in Cologne where he majored in lute. Schäffer was one of the first to abandon "guitar technique" on the lute: he experimented with traditional lute techniques, and their expressive possibilities and implications: e.g. hand positioning, thumb-index alternation, etc.

He taught at the Hochschule für Musik Köln.

References

External links

Recordings
 French Baroque Lute Suites, iss. Nov 1997; Sean; CD release by Sony; Review
 Josef Haydn: Music for Lute and Strings (Michael Schäffer, Eva Nagora, Franz Beyer, Thomas Blees) LP; compiled on the CD: Music For Lute, Guitar, And Mandolin, VOX 
 French Lute Music; Turnabout Records, 1968

1937 births
1978 deaths
German performers of early music
German lutenists
20th-century classical musicians
20th-century German musicians